Valentine Arthur Delory (February 14, 1927 – November 5, 2022) was a Canadian professional ice hockey left winger who played in one National Hockey League game for the New York Rangers during the 1948–49 NHL season. Delory served with the North York Fire Department for 38 years.

See also
List of players who played only one game in the NHL

References

External links

1927 births
2022 deaths
Boston Olympics players
Canadian ice hockey defencemen
Ice hockey people from Toronto
New York Rangers players
New York Rovers players
Oshawa Generals players
St. Paul Saints (USHL) players
Canadian expatriate ice hockey players in the United States